Scient was a San Francisco-based Internet consulting company, founded in 1997, that was one of the large American consulting firms during the dot-com bubble. The company was founded by Eric Greenberg, who had previously founded its competitor, Viant. Its CEO was Robert Howe, the former head of IBM global consulting. At its height in the fall of 2000, it had quarterly revenues of US$100 million, 1,180 employees and a stock price of US$133. In August 2001, it bought rival company iXL; by then its quarterly revenues were down to US$11 million.

In July 2002, the company filed for bankruptcy and was bought by SBI and Company, which became SBI Group. SBI Group later sold Scient with the other members of Avenue A/Razorfish to a company called aQuantive. aQuantive, in turn, was bought by Microsoft in August 2007 and became Microsoft's newly created Advertiser and Publisher Solutions (APS) Group.
On August 9, 2009, Microsoft sold the firm to Publicis Groupe for $530M in cash and stock.

At the time of the IPO in May 1999, the management team was headed by Eric Greenberg, Chairman and Founder, and Robert M. Howe, President & Chief Executive Officer.

References

Online companies of the United States
Technology companies established in 1997